The Middle Letaba River (commonly spelled Middel) is a tributary of the Klein Letaba River, situated in Limpopo, South Africa.

Dams in the river 
 Middle Letaba Dam

See also 
 List of reservoirs and dams in South Africa

Rivers of Limpopo